A constitutional referendum was held in Tunisia on 13 October 1946 as part of the wider French constitutional referendum. Although the new constitution was rejected by 73% of voters in Tunisia, it was approved by 53% of voters overall. Voter turnout was 48.7%.

Results

References

1946 referendums
October 1946 events in Africa
1946 in Tunisia
1946 2